Kanchugarakoppal S. Rangappa, known as Prof. K. S. Rangappa, is an Indian academic who served as the Vice Chancellor of both  University of Mysore and Karnataka State Open University. Presently he is serving as General President, Indian Science Congress Association.

Career 
Rangappa served as Vice Chancellor of Karnataka State Open University from December 2009 to January 2013. He has also served as Vice Chancellor of University of Mysore from January 2013.

Awards 
Rangappa is the Fellow of Royal Society of Chemistry (London), Fellow of the National Academy of Sciences (India) and recipient of the Dr. Raja Ramanna Award for Scientists, and Chemical Research Society of India Bronze Medal. And he is also the recipient of Life time achievement award in the field of education at New Delhi in 2019.

References 

Year of birth missing (living people)
Living people
Academic staff of the University of Mysore